Norway is a destination and to a lesser extent, a transit and origin country for women and girls subjected to human trafficking, specifically forced prostitution, and men and women subjected to forced labor in the domestic service and construction sectors. Some foreign migrants may also be subjected to forced labor in the health care sector. Victims identified in 2009 originated in 45 countries, but most originated in Nigeria or other African countries and Eastern Europe. Often, victims were from minority groups in their countries of origin. Criminal organizations were often involved in human trafficking in Norway, and trafficking schemes varied by victims' countries of origin. Children in Norwegian refugee centers and migrants denied asylum were vulnerable to human trafficking in Norway; 44 children went missing from refugee centers during the 2009 calendar year.

The Government of Norway fully complies with the minimum standards for the elimination of trafficking. The government continued to increase the number of victims identified and forge partnerships with NGOs in Norway and in countries where trafficking victims have originated. Norway convicted and punished a police officer under Norway's anti-trafficking law, sending a strong message of intolerance for trafficking-related official complicity.

The U.S. State Department's Office to Monitor and Combat Trafficking in Persons placed the country in "Tier 1"  in 2017.

Prosecution
The government made some progress in prosecuting sex trafficking offenders and demonstrated a strong response to official complicity in human trafficking. Norway prohibits all forms of trafficking in persons through Criminal Code Section 224, which prescribes a maximum penalty of five years' imprisonment – a penalty sufficiently stringent and commensurate with punishments for other serious offenses, such as rape. Law enforcement officials initiated 31 sex trafficking and 7 labor trafficking investigations in 2009, compared with 41 sex trafficking and four labor trafficking investigations initiated in 2008. Norwegian authorities prosecuted seven people under Section 224 for sex trafficking and initiated no forced labor prosecutions in 2009, compared with one forced labor and five sex trafficking prosecutions in 2008. In 2009, six people were convicted of sex trafficking under Section 224, compared with six convictions obtained in 2008. All of the trafficking offenders convicted in 2009 received jail time; there were no suspended sentences. The average sentence was over 30 months' imprisonment. In January 2010, a Norwegian police officer was convicted and sentenced to 10 years' imprisonment for human trafficking under Section 224. Some government officials suggested that analysis on why some trafficking investigations do not progress to prosecutions or why other sex trafficking cases have been downgraded to charges of pimping would be useful. Some NGOs suggested police drop cases due to a lack of resources for investigations. Norwegian authorities forged partnerships with counterparts in at least 15 countries to advance specific trafficking investigations during the reporting period.

Protection
The Norwegian government made progress in the identification and protection of trafficking victims during the reporting period. Through employment of proactive identification procedures, government officials reported identifying 292 possible trafficking victims, 80 of whom were forced labor victims, in 2009 – an increase from 256 victims, 71 of whom were forced labor victims, identified in 2008. In September 2009, the government conducted a three-day seminar on trafficking victim identification for NGOs and over 200 officials, including police, prosecutors, child welfare specialists, asylum reception center workers, and immigration authorities. The government provided direct assistance services to victims as well as funding for NGOs offering victim services. The government gave trafficking victims in Norway shelter in domestic violence centers, medical care, vocational training, stipends, Norwegian classes, and legal assistance. The government encouraged victims to participate in trafficking investigations and prosecutions; all victims who assisted in the conviction of their traffickers received $20,000 or more in restitution from the government for their trafficking experiences. Victims were permitted to stay in Norway without conditions during a six-month reflection period, a time for victims to receive immediate care and assistance while they consider whether to assist law enforcement – 73 applied for the reflection period, of which 50 were approved and 23 were denied. After the reflection period and deciding to cooperate with the police, 20 victims applied for longer-term residency permits, and 10 received such permits. Trafficking victims reportedly were not penalized during the reporting period for unlawful acts committed as a direct result of being trafficked. The government funded the IOM to provide voluntary and safe repatriation to foreign trafficking victims.

Prevention
The government made some progress in preventing human trafficking during the reporting period. The government acknowledged trafficking as a serious problem, but it did not fund a national anti-trafficking awareness campaign during the reporting period. In an effort to reduce the demand for commercial sex acts, Norway charged 334 people with the purchase or attempted purchase of sex services. Norway coordinated the government's anti-trafficking efforts through an anti-trafficking inter-ministerial commission chaired by a senior advisor at the Ministry of Justice. The inter-ministerial commission systematically monitored Norway's anti-trafficking efforts through annual statistical reports, which are available to the public. The government enhanced its global partnership against trafficking by disbursing approximately $17.8 million in anti-trafficking aid over the last two years to international organizations and NGOs operating outside Norway, including in Nigeria. The government provides funding to ECPAT in an effort to reduce the demand for participation in international child sex tourism by Norwegian nationals. The government provided anti-human trafficking training to Norwegian troops prior to their deployment overseas on international peacekeeping missions.

References

Norway
Norway
Norway
Human rights abuses in Norway
Crime in Norway by type
Women's rights in Norway